Lefa Tsapi (born 18 May 1961) is a Lesotho boxer. He competed in the men's welterweight event at the 1984 Summer Olympics.

References

1961 births
Living people
Lesotho male boxers
Olympic boxers of Lesotho
Boxers at the 1984 Summer Olympics
Place of birth missing (living people)
Welterweight boxers